Basloukit  or Beslouqit  is a village in Zgharta District, in the Northern Governorate of Lebanon. 

The people of the village are predominantly  Maronite Christians.

References

External links
Ehden Family Tree 

Populated places in the North Governorate
Zgharta District
Maronite Christian communities in Lebanon